"Not Too Late" is a song recorded by Australian singer and songwriter Ricki-Lee Coulter. It was written by Coulter, Neil Ormandy and Steve Soloma, and released on 1 September 2017. The "lulling, soft ballad" marks a departure from Coulter's previous dance releases, and she said the song is about "redemption and it never being too late to right our wrongs and start again."

Background and release
Coulter and husband/manager Rich Harrison moved to Los Angeles in 2015 and began working on her fifth studio album. The singer spent months writing “empty” formulaic songs or sticking to the dance and R&B genre of her previous hits "Can't Touch It", "Do It Like That" and "Burn It Down".

In an interview with news.com.au's Cameron Adams, Coulter said: "Pivoting musically is scary, but I really have faith in this song. I watch people's faces when they hear it for the first time and their reactions are different to those for any song I've done before. It's such a special song. It still gets me every time." The vocals on the finished version are from the original demo. Coulter said: "I wanted people to hear the pain in these lyrics and feel where this song is coming from. We didn't re-record it — it's the demo vocal I did on the day. I sang the hell out of it and that was it. We thought about re-recording it, but there was something about that vocal that had all that emotion and fury and passion in it."

Track listing
Digital download
"Not Too Late" – 3:41

Charts

Release history

References

2017 songs
2017 singles
Ricki-Lee Coulter songs
Songs written by Neil Ormandy
Songs written by Ricki-Lee Coulter
Universal Music Australia singles